Chivalry & Sorcery is a fantasy role-playing game first published in 1977 by Fantasy Games Unlimited. Created by Edward E. Simbalist and Wilf K. Backhaus in 1977, Chivalry & Sorcery (C&S) was an early competitor to Dungeons & Dragons (D&D). The designers of the game were dissatisfied with the lack of realism in D&D and created a gaming system derived from it, named Chevalier. They intended to present it to Gary Gygax at Gen Con in 1977 but changed their minds once at Gen Con once they met Scott Bizar who wrote out a letter of intent. After some changes eliminated the last remnants of D&D (e.g. the game contained a table of "Saving-throws" similar to D&D), Simbalist and Backhaus published the first edition of their game, now renamed Chivalry & Sorcery.

According to Michael Tresca, Chivalry & Sorcery "embraced a realistic approach to medieval France in the 12th century, complete with feudalism and the Catholic Church..." and he noted that the game was one of the first to use the term "game master" and was also "one of the first games to place the setting at utmost importance over the mechanics of the game." More focused on medieval chivalry than fantasy, Chivalry & Sorcery had from its inception a sophisticated and complex set of rules.

Editions

First edition (C&S1) 
Fantasy Games Unlimited published the first edition in 1977.

The game includes rules for character creation, combat, magic, and wargames. The background is influenced by medieval France and Christianity, with Knights (tournaments, courtly love, fiefs, political influence), and a hierarchical priesthood who could perform miracles. The first edition also incorporates elements from J. R. R. Tolkien including hobbits and balrogs. These references disappeared in later editions for trademark reasons.

Creating a character 
Creating a character begins with the random selection of their race. Once race is specified, the player randomly draws "primary" characteristics, as well as size, weight, and astral sign. Characters also have seven Primary Characteristics: Dexterity, Strength, Constitution, Intelligence, Wisdom, Appearance, and Bardic Voice.

Secondary Characteristics are derived from the primary characteristics and modified by the character's size and weight. They consist of  Body points (BP, or how much damage their body can take before dying), Fatigue points (FP, or how much exertion their body can take before collapsing), Charisma (CHA, or leadership), Carrying Capacity (CC, how much weight they can lift or carry), Personal Combat Factor (PCF, fighting skill and proficiency with melee weapons), Military Ability Factor (MAF, or ability to command and direct an army) and Command Level (CL, or ability to lead an army).

Alignment in Chivalry & Sorcery is either selected or rolled randomly on a d20 (20-sided die) table and scored from 1 to 20. This corresponds to Lawful (1-7), Neutral (8-15) or Chaotic (16–20), with the number indicating a named level within that alignment (for examples: 1 is Lawful-Saintly, 11 is Neutral-Worldly, and 20 is Chaotic-Diabolical). The system is heavily influenced by the values and teachings of the Christian religion.

The astral sign, accompanied by auspices (favorable, unfavorable or neutral), determines if the character is more or less born under a lucky star regarding their vocation. For example, the sign Leo is a good sign for warriors while the sign Scorpio is a good sign for magicians. This results primarily (but not only) in a gain greater or lesser experience in the tasks performed.

A character can also have one or more phobias or other mental illness,. Social status is important, and a random drawing determines the origin and social rank of the character. Finally, accounting for the characteristics, the astral sign, social background, race and natural inclination, the player decides what role the character will follow.

Magic 
The magic system was created by Wilf Backhaus and inspired mainly by Real Magic by Isaac Bonewits. A magician's capability is defined by their Concentration Level (which depends on their characteristics, bonus astral and experience) which determines their Magic Level (MKL). The MKL determines what level of spells will be available (a new level of spells are available both MKL). The highest MKL a magician can have is 22 (as the 22 "Major Arcana" cards of occult tarot). On the other hand, the Personal Magic Factor (PMF) of a magician depends on its characteristics and its MKL and defines its ability to affect the world around them. In practice, PMF determines the scope and duration of spells and the number of volumes of materials used by the Magic User (see below on Magic Basic).

Reception
Two reviews of Chivalry & Sorcery appeared in Ares Magazine. In the inaugural issue of March 1980, Greg Costikyan gave the game an average score of 6 out of 9, saying, "Although the lack of world-design rules and poor organization are sorely felt, C&S remains the best full-scale complicated frp game published to date." In the September 1980 edition (Issue #4), Eric Goldberg liked the well-researched information on the medieval period — particularly heraldry — presented in the rules, but bemoaned the complexity, saying, "The worst problem arises when the game is actually played — it can move as awkwardly as an octopus on dry land." Goldberg called the production values primitive — "The text consists of reduced reproductions of typewritten pages, and the illustrations are fair to mediocre." He also found the extensive rules extremely disorganized. Although Goldberg admitted that "No FRP system has since matched the quantity and quality of its technical system design", he did not recommend the game: "C&S is a poor game for all but the serious devotee of fantasy. It is a worthy purchase for he who wishes a reference work from which to authenticate FRP rules; it is a terrible investment for he who wishes one FRP system upon which to base a campaign."

In the October 1981 edition of The Space Gamer (Issue No. 44), Jon Tindel agreed that the rules were complex and extensive, but thought that the investment of time to learn them was worth it: "It has been said that C&S is unplayable, that it is better as a work of reference, but that is emphatically untrue. I know many people who play C&S and enjoy the game very much [...] It all comes down to one question: are you willing to spend the time to learn the complicated rules? If you are, by all means buy C&S; your reward will be many hours of joy. If you are not, stay away, it is not for you."

In the 1980 book The Complete Book of Wargames, game designer Jon Freeman thought that the game was too complex to be played, and added "Even if the question of complexity were disregarded, it's not suited for dungeon adventures of the conventional sort, and indeed the monsters and most of the fantasy material are included almost as an afterthought." He also thought the magic systems, although "interesting, well researched and fairly 'realistic', [are] wildly unsuited to normal adventuring." Freeman concluded by suggesting that the game was more suitable as reference material for another role-playing game, and gave it an Overall Evaluation of "Poor as a game; Excellent as a source."  

In a retrospective review of Chivalry & Sorcery in Black Gate, James Maliszewski said "Fond as I am of C&S, there's little question in my mind that those tools were often hard to use and cumbersome. Despite that, at least in the circles in which I moved, C&S was very influential. I didn’t know anyone who actually played the game itself, but the ideas Backhaus and Simbalist advanced through it held a lot of power."

Reviews
Fantastic Science Fiction v27 n9
Jeux & Stratégie #14

Second edition (C&S2) 
The second edition, released in 1983, was presented in a cardboard box containing three booklets of rules. There are no fundamental mechanical changes as compared with C&S1, but multiple changes try to clarify or simplify some points in the rules. The medieval setting was clearly divided into three distinct periods: Early Feudal, High and Late Chivalric Feudal, each period having a distinct technology. For example: Heavy plate armor and two-handed swords only become available in Late Feudal (14th - 15th centuries).

Reception
In the October 1983 edition of White Dwarf (Issue 46), Marcus Rowland gave the improved production values of the second edition a 10 out of 10, but found various aspects were still overly complex: "Overall, character generation in C&S is still extremely complicated and might take inexperienced players several hours, especially if they make the fatal mistake of working in the wrong order... Skill acquisition in C&S is almost indescribably complex and involves at least three distinct systems." Rowland did admit that some of the complexity allowed for very unique characters. "Probably the best feature of these rules is their attention to detail... expressed in such minutiae as the table used to develop the exact culinary skills, and... tables for Eye and Hair color." Rowland concluded by scoring the complexity of the game 10 out of 10 and its playability only 6 out of 10, and expressed reservations about the suitability for new gamers: "I cannot recommend this game to inexperienced referees or players, but anyone with some knowledge of roleplaying games who is looking for a complex system for a prolonged campaign will probably find Chivalry & Sorcery ideal. If the rules were slightly better organized and the set gave more aid in character generation and setting up campaigns, I would not have these reservations."

Paul Mason reviewed Chivalry & Sorcery 2nd Edition for Imagine magazine, and stated that "Chivalry & Sorcery mistakenly attempts to compete with the AD&D game in terms of detail – a hopeless task which can only produce a fragmented and complex set of rules. As a reference work, and as a source of ideas for incorporation into other games, Chivalry & Sorcery is still excellent, but I doubt it will shake its popular image as a cult game on the fringes of the hobby mainstream."

In the April 1984 edition of Dragon (Issue 84), Ken Rolston found the overhauled rules of the second edition were still too complicated, saying, "The game was revised to broaden its appeal, but the presentation still shows problems, and the audience is still limited, because of the bulk and detail involved. This game is committed to comprehensiveness, at the expense of comprehensibility... C&S is still the most difficult and time-consuming FRP system on the market, when played at a level that fully exploits its virtues." Rolston warns that even the revised edition still is not meant for newcomers and part-time players: "This is the wrong product for the beginning or casual FRP gamer. For the intermediate gamer, it may be useful as a supplement and sourcebook. But as a complete campaign system, the virtues of C&S are only fully realized in the hands of the superior gamer — one who’s serious, sophisticated, dedicated, and familiar with medieval history, legend, and fantasy literature."

Reviews
Casus Belli (Issue 5 - Sep 1981)
Fantasy Gamer #6
Different Worlds #36 (Sept./Oct., 1984)

Third edition (C&S3) 
The game was revised and reissued in a Third Edition (dubbed The Green Book, from its color) by Highlander Designs (HD), an American publishing house founded by G. W. Thompson. The authors of the third edition were Ed Simbalist, Wilf Backhaus and G. W. Thompson. C&S3 features the almost complete disappearance of medieval references. The Third Edition removed the integral gritty medieval French historical and cultural background to make it more flexible and customizable. 
 
C&S3 established a system of "skills" which covers all areas of the game, including fighting, magic, knowledge of geography, languages, dances and songs, and other things a person is able to do or know. The talent system (called "Skills cape") uses a percentile die and a 10-sided die (D10) for all actions determined by talent. The D10 determining if the success (or failure) of talent is "critical" or not.

Reception
The reviewer from Pyramid #29 (Jan./Feb., 1998) stated that "It definitely uses some modern production features (though the layout is a bit busy and plagued by typos), but the defining aspects of most '90s games - quick character generation, rules-lightness, storytelling not dice-rolling - aren't a part of this game. Instead, C&S3 recalls the early days of gaming with an emphasis on rules and charts to cover just about any conceivable situation."

Reviews
Valkyrie #14 (1997)
Arcane #17
Backstab (Issue 2 - Mar/Apr 1997)

Fourth edition (C&S4) 

Highlander Designs went bankrupt and was bought by Britannia Game Designs Ltd. (BGD), a company based in England and directed by Steve Turner. The fourth edition of C&S, called "The Rebirth" was born a few months later.

The core rules had several extensions, including the "Knights Companion", "Armorers Companion," "Dwarves Companion" and "Elves Companion".

Fifth edition (C&S5) 

Britannia Game Designs Ltd. launched a Kickstarter campaign to launch the Fifth Edition of the game that successfully completed on July 31, 2019, the game shipped in February 2020.

Awards
Chivalry & Sorcery won the H.G. Wells award for All Time Best Ancient Medieval Rules of 1979.

References 

 
Fantasy role-playing games
Fantasy Games Unlimited games
Origins Award winners
Role-playing games introduced in 1977